Yount's Woolen Mill and Boarding House is a historic woolen mill and boarding house located in Ripley Township, Montgomery County, Indiana. The boarding house was built in 1851, and is a two-story, "L"-shaped, Late Federal style brick building. It has a gable-on-hip roof and two-story porch on the rear side. The mill was built in 1864, and is a -story brick building on a raised basement with Greek Revival style design elements. Also on the property are the remains of an 1849 frame mill, an 1867 brick building, dam and mill race. The Yount Mill was contracted by the U.S. Government to manufacture Army uniforms during both the American Civil War and Spanish–American War.

It was listed on the National Register of Historic Places in 1989.

References

External links

 

Industrial buildings and structures on the National Register of Historic Places in Indiana
Residential buildings on the National Register of Historic Places in Indiana
Industrial buildings completed in 1867
Residential buildings completed in 1851
Federal architecture in Indiana
Greek Revival architecture in Indiana
Buildings and structures in Montgomery County, Indiana
National Register of Historic Places in Montgomery County, Indiana
1851 establishments in Indiana